The 2010 USL Premier Development League season was the 16th season of the PDL. The regular season began on April 24, 2010, and ended on July 26. The playoffs began on Friday, July 30 and concluded with the PDL Championship Game on August 8. As in previous years, the PDL Championship Game was broadcast live on Fox Soccer Channel in the United States, with commentary by Kenn Tomasch and Jon Billings.

The Portland Timbers U23's ended the season as national champions, beating Thunder Bay Chill 4-1 in the 2010 PDL Championship game. The Timbers also had the best regular season record, winning all their 16 games, scoring 53 goals and conceding just six along the way. In doing so the Saplings became the first team to post a perfect PDL regular season record since the Jackson Chargers in 1998, the first regular season champion to win the playoffs since the Central Coast Roadrunners in 1996, and the first team in PDL history to go through an entire PDL regular season and playoff campaign without posting a loss or a tie.

Portland Timbers U23's striker Brent Richards was named League MVP and Rookie of the Year for his stellar campaign with the national champions, while Timbers head coach Jim Rilatt was named Coach of the Year. Joe Tait of the Baton Rouge Capitals was named Defender of the Year after scoring  six goals and an assist in 12 games, and helping his team to the national final four. Ryan Meara of Newark Ironbound Express was named Goalkeeper of the Year after recording an impressive eight shutout wins in only 12 games played, and ranking fourth in the league in goals-against average at 0.666.

Players from Canadian side Thunder Bay Chill led the majority of the statistical categories, with striker Brandon Swartzendruber leading the league with 15 goals, while his teammate Gustavo Oliveira led the league with 13 assists. Portland Timbers U23's goalkeeper Jacob Gleeson enjoyed the best goalkeeping statistics, allowing just five goals in 15 games and earning a 0.360 GAA average.

Changes from 2009

Name changes 
El Paso Patriots changed their name to Chivas El Paso Patriots after signing a formal partnership with Mexican side Guadalajara.
Los Angeles Legends were taken over by the ownership group of the Los Angeles-based amateur side LA Blues, and rebranded themselves Los Angeles Azul Legends.
Ocean City Barons changed their name to Ocean City Nor'easters after splitting from the South Jersey Barons Youth Academy and holding a "name the team" contest to decide their new nickname.
Reading Rage became an official minor league affiliate of MLS expansion team Philadelphia Union, and renamed themselves Reading United.
Seattle Wolves merged with a local youth soccer organization and renamed themselves Washington Crossfire.

New franchises 
Eight franchises were announced as joining the league this year:

Folding 
Nine teams were announced as leaving the league prior to the beginning of the season:
Austin Aztex U23 - Austin, Texas
Bakersfield Brigade - Bakersfield, California
Cary Clarets - Cary, North Carolina
Cascade Surge - Salem, Oregon
Fort Wayne Fever - Fort Wayne, Indiana
Fredericksburg Gunners - Fredericksburg, Virginia
Panama City Pirates - Panama City, Florida
Rhode Island Stingrays - East Providence, Rhode Island
Virginia Legacy - Williamsburg, Virginia

Standings

Note: The first tie-breaker in PDL standings is head-to-head results between teams tied on points, which is why some teams with inferior goal differences finish ahead in the standings.

Central Conference

Great Lakes Division

Heartland Division

Eastern Conference

Mid Atlantic Division

Northeast Division

Southern Conference

Mid South Division

Southeast Division

Western Conference

Northwest Division

Southwest Division

Playoffs

Format
The 2010 PDL playoffs will feature 16 teams, down from 24 the previous year. The format will have each division winner play against the second-place team in their counterpart division within their respective conference.

Bracket

Conference semifinals

Conference finals

PDL Semifinals

Third-Place Game

PDL Final

Award winners and finalists
MVP: Brent Richards (POR) (winner), Moses Aduny (MIS), Andrew Rigby (OTT), Brandon Swartzendruber (TB)
Rookie of the Year: Brent Richards (POR) (winner), Fredrik Brustad (CF), Dominic Reinold (NJ)
Defender of the Year: Joe Tait (BR) (winner), Matt Hedges (REA), Mark Lee (KIT), Alexis Pradié (OTT), 
Goalkeeper of the Year: Ryan Meara (NWK)
Coach of the Year: Jim Rilatt (POR) (winner), Brendan Burke (REA), Dave Dixon (MIS), Martin Painter (LON)

All-League and All-Conference teams

Eastern Conference
F: Will Beaugé (OTT), Dominic Reinold (NJ), C. J. Sapong (REA)
M: Frank Alesci* (NWK), Luke Mulholland (REA), Scott Rojo* (CAR)
D: Chris Christian (CJ), John Fletcher (OcC), Matt Hedges* (REA), Alexis Pradié* (OTT)
G: Ryan Meara* (NWK)

Central Conference
F: Gustavo Oliveira (TB), Brandon Swartzendruber (TB), Kenny Uzoigwe* (MIC)
M: Steven Beattie (CIN), Alan McGreal (LON), Jeremy Warman (KC)
D: C.J. Brown (KAL), Stewart Givens (MIC), Logan McDaniel (DM), Sebastian Stihler (LON)
G: Oscar Moens (DAY)

Southern Conference
F: Moses Aduny* (MIS), Ben Callon (BR), Ryan Maloney (ATL)
M: Jonathan Mendoza (CF), Lucas Paulini (MIS), Carl Reynolds (NO)
D: Willie Hunt (MIS), Ryan McDonald (NAS), Guilherme Reis (BRD), Joe Tait* (BR)
G: Leif Craddock (WTU)

Western Conference
F: Jaime Chavez (HU), Brent Richards* (POR), Amani Walker (OrC)
M: Freddie Braun* (POR), Cameron Hepple (KIT), Jordan Hughes (VIC)
D: Mo Aziz (ABB), Ryan Kawulok (POR), Mark Lee* (KIT), Daniel Scott (KIT)
G. Jake Gleeson (POR)

* denotes All-League player

See also
United Soccer Leagues 2010
2010 NPSL Season
2010 W-League Season

References

2010
4